The 15th Pan American Games were held in Rio de Janeiro, Brazil from 13 July 2007 to 29 July 2007.

Medals

Gold

Men's Individual Competition: Adrian Puentes

Men's 800 metres: Yeimer López
Men's 110m Hurdles: Dayron Robles
Men's High Jump: Víctor Moya
Men's Javelin: Guillermo Martínez
Women's 200 metres: Roxana Díaz
Women's Marathon: Mariela González
Women's 4 × 400 m Relay: Aymée Martínez, Daimy Pernia, Zulia Calatayud, and Indira Terrero
Women's Triple Jump: Yargelis Savigne
Women's Shot Put: Misleydis González
Women's Discus: Yarelis Barrios
Women's Hammer: Yipsi Moreno
Women's Javelin: Osleidys Menéndez

Men's Team Competition: Cuba national baseball team

Men's Featherweight (– 57 kg): Idel Torriente
Men's Lightweight (– 60 kg): Yordenis Ugás
Men's Middleweight (– 75 kg): Emilio Correa
Men's Heavyweight (– 91 kg): Osmay Acosta
Men's Super Heavyweight (+ 91 kg): Robert Alfonso

Men's 10m Platform: José Guerra

Men's Team Épée: Camilo Boris, Andrés Carrilo, David Castillo, and Guillermo Madrigal
Women's Sabre: Mailyn González
Women's Team Sabre: Misleydis Compañy, Ana Faez, Mailyn González, and Jennifer Morales

Men's Double Sculls: Yoennis Hernández and Janier Concepción
Men's Quadruple Sculls: Yuleydis Cascaret, Janier Concepción, Ángel Fournier, and Yoennis Hernández
Men's Lightweight Double Sculls: Eyder Batista and Yunior Pérez
Women's Single Sculls: Mayra González
Women's Lightweight Double Sculls: Yaima Velázquez and Ismaray Marerro

Men's Middleweight (– 80 kg): Ángel Matos
Men's Heavyweight (+ 80 kg): Gerardo Ortiz

Women's Team Competition: Cuba women's national volleyball team

Men's – 56 kg: Sergio Álvarez
Men's – 69 kg: Yordanis Borrero
Men's – 77 kg: Iván Cambar
Men's – 94 kg: Yoandry Hernández
Men's – 105 kg: Joel MacKenzie

Silver

Men's Individual Competition: Juan Carlos Stevens

Men's Long Jump: Wilfredo Martínez
Men's Triple Jump: Osniel Tosca
Men's Decathlon: Yordanis García
Women's Shot Put: Yumileidi Cumbá
Women's Discus: Yania Ferrales
Women's Hammer: Arasay Thondike
Women's Javelin: Sonia Bisset
Women's Heptathlon: Gretchen Quintana

Men's Light-Heavyweight (– 81 kg): Yusiel Nápoles

Men's 3m Springboard Synchronized: Erick Fornaris and Jorge Betancourt
Men's 10m Platform Synchronized: Erick Fornaris and José Guerra

Men's Épée: Andrés Carrilo

Women's Team Competition: Cuba women's national handball team

Men's Kumite (– 60 kg): Eynar Tamame
Men's Kumite (– 75 kg): Jorge Zaragoza

Men's Individual Competition: Yaniel Velazquez

Men's Single Sculls: Yoennis Hernández

Men's – 85 kg: Jadier Valladares

Bronze

Men's 3.000m Steeplechase: José Alberto Sánchez
Men's 110m Hurdles: Yoel Hernández
Men's Triple Jump: Yoandri Betanzos
Men's Shot Put: Carlos Véliz
Women's 400 metres: Indira Terrero
Women's 800 metres: Zulia Calatayud
Women's 4 × 100 m Relay: Virgen Benavides, Roxana Díaz, Misleidys Lazo and Anay Tejeda
Women's Pole Vault: Yarisley Garcia
Women's Long Jump: Yargelis Savigne
Women's Triple Jump: Mabel Gay

Women's Team Competition: Cuba women's national basketball team

Men's Flyweight (– 51 kg): Yoandri Salinas
Men's Light-Welterweight (– 64 kg): Innocente Fiss

Women's Foil: Misleydis Compañy
Women's Team Foil: Misleydis Compañy, Eimey Gómez, Annis Hechavarria, and Adriagne Rivot

Men's Team Competition: Cuba men's national handball team

Women's Kumite (+ 60 kg): Yaneya Gutiérrez

Men's Lightweight Coxless Fours: Eyder Batista, Dixan Massip, Iran González, and Yunior Pérez
Women's Double Sculls: Yursleydis Venet and Mayra González

Men's Flyweight (– 58 kg): Frank Díaz
Women's Lightweight (– 57 kg): Yaimara Rosario
Women's Heavyweight (+ 67 kg): Mirna Hechavarria

Men's Team Competition: Cuba men's national volleyball team

Women's Team Competition: Cuba women's national water polo team

Results by event

Basketball

Women's Team Competition
Preliminary round (group B)
Defeated Argentina (81-79)
Defeated Colombia (81-53)
Lost to United States (63-78)
Semifinal
Lost to Brazil (60-79)
Bronze Medal Match
Defeated Canada (62-49) → Bronze Medal
Team Roster
Yamara Amargo
Suchitel Avila
Yaima Boulet
Cariola Echevarría
Oyanaisis Gelis
Yamilé Martínez
Clenia Noblet
Leidys Oquendo
Yaquelín Plutín
Arlenys Romero
Yolyseny Soria
Taimara Suero
Head coach: Alberto Zabala

Triathlon

Men's Competition
Michel González
 1:53:34.57 — 7th place
Carlos Rodríguez
 1:56:08.08 — 17th place
Ramon Alberich
 1:57:05.07 — 22nd place

Women's Competition
Yanitza Pérez
 2:03:49.24 — 13th place
Venus Rodríguez
 2:05:28.44 — 17th place
Maydelen Justo
 2:11:21.32 — 23rd place

Volleyball

Men's Team Competition
Team Roster
Jorge Sánchez Salgado
Tornakeibel Gutierrez
Pavel Pimienta (c)
Michael Sánchez
Rolando Jurquin
Pedro Iznaga
Robertlandy Simón
Raydel Hierrezuelo
Oriol Camejo
Raydel Corrales
Odelvis Dominico
Yoandri Díaz
Head coach: Orlando Samuel

Women's Team Competition
Team Roster
Yumilka Ruíz
Yanelis Santos
Nancy Carrillo
Yenisey González
Daimí Ramírez
Yaima Ortíz
Yusleinis Herrera
Liana Mesa Luaces
Rosir Calderón
Kenia Carcaces
Yusidey Silié
Zoila Barros
Head coach: Antonio Perdomo

See also
 Cuba at the 2008 Summer Olympics

External links
Cuban delegation at the 2007 Pan American Games

Nations at the 2007 Pan American Games
P
2007